Bob Ramsey is a retired American soccer player.  He spent time in the American Soccer League, Major Indoor Soccer League and American Indoor Soccer Association.

Ramsey attended the University of Washington, playing on the men's soccer team in 1976 and 1977.   In 1981, he signed with the Pittsburgh Spirit of the Major Indoor Soccer League where he played for three seasons.  In 1983, he played the summer with the Pennsylvania Stoners of the American Soccer League.  In 1984, he joined the Louisville Thunder of the American Indoor Soccer Association.  He also played one season (1986–1987) with the Fort Wayne Flames where he also served as an assistant coach.

External links
 MISL/ASL stats

Living people
1957 births
American soccer coaches
American soccer players
American Indoor Soccer Association coaches
American Indoor Soccer Association players
American Soccer League (1933–1983) players
Fort Wayne Flames players
Louisville Thunder players
Major Indoor Soccer League (1978–1992) players
Pennsylvania Stoners players
Pittsburgh Spirit players
Washington Huskies men's soccer players
Soccer players from Seattle
Association football defenders
Association football midfielders